John Engels (January 19, 1931 South Bend, Indiana - June 13, 2007 Vermont) was an American poet.

Life
John Engels graduated from University of Notre Dame in 1952.  After Navy service, Engels studied at the University College, Dublin, then graduated from the Iowa Writers' Workshop, with an M.F.A. in 1957.  He taught at St. Norbert College, and Saint Michael's College, Sweet Briar College, Randolph-Macon Woman's College, Middlebury College, and Emory University, and the University of Alabama. In 1995, he was Wyndham Robertson Chair at Hollins College.

Engels' work appeared in Harper's, the New Yorker,  and many other prestigious journals.

Awards
 1976 Frost Fellow at Bread Loaf Writers Conference
 1979 Guggenheim Fellowship
 1986 National Poetry Series, for Cardinals in the Ice Age
 1988 Poet in residence at The Frost Place

Works
"Adam After the Ice Storm", Poetry Foundation
"Love Poem--Describing the Austere Comfort of the Dream in Which Nothing Is Named", Ploughshares, Spring 1977

References

1931 births
2007 deaths
American male poets
University of Notre Dame alumni
Alumni of University College Dublin
Iowa Writers' Workshop alumni
St. Norbert College faculty
Saint Michael's College faculty
Sweet Briar College faculty
Middlebury College faculty
Emory University faculty
University of Alabama faculty
20th-century American poets
20th-century American male writers